Stichopites is an extinct genus of sea cucumbers which existed during the Anisian age of the Middle Triassic to the Kimmeridgian age of the Late Jurassic (approximately 245.0 to 150.8 million years ago). The type species is Stichopites mortenseni.  Fossils of Stichopites have been recovered in Poland, France, and Egypt.

References

Stichopitidae
Prehistoric sea cucumber genera
Anisian first appearances
Late Jurassic extinctions
Anisian life